Eugene Short Jr. (August 7, 1953 – March 16, 2016) was an American professional basketball player. He was a 6'6" 200 lb small forward and attended Jackson State University.

Short was selected 9th overall by the NBA's New York Knicks in the 1975 NBA Draft. In the previous year he was selected by the American Basketball Association's San Antonio Spurs in the fifth round of the 1974 ABA Draft.

He played for the US national team in the 1974 FIBA World Championship, winning the bronze medal.

He played for the Seattle SuperSonics and New York Knicks (1975–76) in the NBA for 34 games.

Eugene was the older brother of Purvis Short, another onetime NBA player.

References

External links

1953 births
2016 deaths
African-American basketball players
Basketball players from Mississippi
Jackson State Tigers basketball players
New York Knicks draft picks
New York Knicks players
Parade High School All-Americans (boys' basketball)
People from Macon, Mississippi
Seattle SuperSonics players
Small forwards
United States men's national basketball team players
American men's basketball players
20th-century African-American sportspeople
21st-century African-American people
1974 FIBA World Championship players